The Taliaferro County School District is a public school district in Taliaferro County, Georgia, United States, based in Crawfordville. It serves the communities of Crawfordville and Sharon.

Schools
The Taliaferro County School District has one charter school offering pre-school to grade twelve.

Charter school
Taliaferro County Charter School

References

External links

School districts in Georgia (U.S. state)
Education in Taliaferro County, Georgia